Justin Carl Fontaine (born November 6, 1987) is a Canadian former professional ice hockey player. He played in the National Hockey League (NHL) for the Minnesota Wild.

Playing career
Fontaine attended the University of Minnesota Duluth where he played four seasons (2007–2011) of NCAA college hockey with the Minnesota–Duluth Bulldogs.

On April 19, 2011, the Minnesota Wild signed Fontaine as a free agent to an entry-level contract. In the 2013–14 season, Fontaine scored his first NHL goal on October 12, 2013 against Dan Ellis of the Dallas Stars 12 seconds into the first period – a Minnesota Wild record. Later the same night, fellow rookie teammate Mathew Dumba notched his first. Fontaine scored three goals on January 9, 2014, against the Phoenix Coyotes for his first career NHL Hat Trick.

In his rookie season, Fontaine notched 13 goals, a good secondary scoring player for the Wild, although his 13 goals were impressive, Fontaine was sometimes a healthy scratch in favor of veteran players, when he did play however, he was mostly used as third or fourth liner. Fontaine finished his rookie season with 13 goals and 8 assists for 21 points. On July 29, 2014, Fontaine was re-signed to a 2-year contract. Fontaine played 9 playoff games, adding a goal and an assist against Colorado and Chicago.

Fontaine's playing time increased in his sophomore season, as he was constantly juggled from line to line. His role changes however, did not affect his play, as he was able to adapt rather quickly to playing on different lines and with different players. He was sometimes used as first or second liner when injuries came upon the Wild, and was credited for not changing his game when he was shuffled around. Fontaine showed signs of his old scoring self, but showed some of his playmaking skills as well. Fontaine's goals decreased to just 8, but he did however, notch 22 assists.

On March 27, 2014 in a game against the Calgary Flames Fontaine took a huge hit from Joe Colborne , the hit was deemed dirty by Wild players and Fontaine, because he did not have the puck at the time. Fontaine was able to stay in the game however, and on his very next shift, Fontaine setup Thomas Vanek's 20th goal to tie the game at 1, en route to a 4–2 Wild win.

After ending his 5-year association with the Minnesota Wild, as a free agent off-season, Fontaine was unable to attain an NHL contract. On September 8, 2016, he agreed to attend the Florida Panthers training camp on a professional try-out contract.

On October 16, 2016, Fontaine signed a 1-year, 2-way deal with the New York Rangers and was immediately assigned to their American Hockey League (AHL) affiliate, the Hartford Wolf Pack. However, after collecting 30 points in 50 games with the Wolf Pack on March 1, 2017, Fontaine was traded by the Rangers to the Edmonton Oilers in exchange for Taylor Beck.

As a free agent from the Oilers following the completion of his contract, Fontaine opted to pursue a career abroad in agreeing to a one-year deal with HC Dinamo Minsk of the KHL on July 31, 2017.

Career statistics

Awards and honours

References

External links

1987 births
Living people
Bakersfield Condors players
Bonnyville Pontiacs players
Canadian ice hockey right wingers
HC Dinamo Minsk players
Hartford Wolf Pack players
Houston Aeros (1994–2013) players
Ice hockey people from Alberta
Kölner Haie players
HC Kunlun Red Star players
Minnesota Duluth Bulldogs men's ice hockey players
Minnesota Wild players
People from the Municipal District of Bonnyville No. 87
Undrafted National Hockey League players
Canadian expatriate ice hockey players in Belarus
Canadian expatriate ice hockey players in China